Saurillodon is a genus of prehistoric lizard of the Late Jurassic of Portugal, UK and Morrison Formation of Western North America.

Present in stratigraphic zone 4.

See also

 Paleobiota of the Morrison Formation

References

Jurassic lizards
Morrison fauna